Cristoforo Domenico Carullo,  (7 August 1889 – 31 January 1968) was an Italian Catholic prelate and a Franciscan friar. He served as the Bishop of Lacedonia from 1940 to 1968 and as the Archbishop of Conza-Sant'Angelo dei Lombardi-Bisaccia from 1946 to 1968.

Biography 
Carullo was born on 7 August 1889 in Stefanaconi in Calabria, Italy. He was ordained a priest on 26 July 1914 in the Order of Friars Minor and appointed Bishop of Lacedonia ad personam on 2 February 1940, being ordained on 28 April 1940 and succeeding Giulio Tommasi. Archbishop Enrico Montalbetti acted as principal consecrator, while Bishops Felice Cribellati and Demetrio Moscato acted as co-consecrators. He held the position until 1968.

On 15 September 1946 he was appointed the Archbishop of Conza-Sant'Angelo dei Lombardi-Bisaccia and held this title coextensively with his title of Lacedonia until his death. Carullo died on 31 January 1968.

References 

1889 births
1968 deaths
People from the Province of Vibo Valentia
20th-century Italian Roman Catholic bishops
Archbishops of Sant'Angelo dei Lombardi-Conza-Nusco-Bisaccia
20th-century Italian people
19th-century Italian people
Italian Franciscans
Franciscan bishops